"Two People" is a song by recording artist Tina Turner. It was written by Terry Britten and Graham Lyle, with production helmed by the former, and released as the second single from her sixth solo album Break Every Rule (1986).

Versions and remixes
 Album version – 4:09
 Dance mix – 8:24
 Dub Mix – 7:00
 Tender Mix – 7:15

Personnel 
 Tina Turner – lead vocals 
 Nick Glennie-Smith – keyboards
 Billy Livsey – keyboards 
 Terry Britten – guitars, bass, backing vocals 
 Jack Bruno – drums

Charts
"Two People" became a top ten hit in Germany and Switzerland, and reached the top 20 in Austria, the Netherlands on Billboards Hot R&B/Hip-Hop Songs chart. It was also a #30 pop hit on ''Billboard's Hot 100 chart in the United States.

Weekly charts

Music video
There were two music videos to "Two People", including one with Turner dressed as different characters, such as Cinderella.

References 

Tina Turner songs
1986 singles
1986 songs
Songs written by Terry Britten